Usonia Historic District was a planned community and is now a national historic district located in Town of Mount Pleasant, adjacent to the village of Pleasantville, Westchester County, New York. In 1945, a  rural tract was purchased by a cooperative of young couples from New York City, who were able to enlist Frank Lloyd Wright to build his Broadacre City concept. Wright decided where each house should be placed. Wright designed three homes himself and approved architectural plans of the other 44, which were designed by such architects as Paul Schweikher, Theodore Dixon Bower, Ulrich Franzen, Kaneji Domoto, Aaron Resnick and David Henken – an engineer and Wright apprentice.

The layout of the neighborhood was planned by Wright in a circular manner, preserving most of the original trees and "encouraging the flow of the land". The balance of the homes were decreed to be in the modern "organic" style ordained by Wright. The community was named "Usonia" in homage to Wright, whose ideas on the way Americans should live together guided their plan.

It was listed on the National Register of Historic Places in 2012 as the Usonia Historic District. The historic district encompasses 43 contributing buildings, 1 contributing site, and 3 contributing structures.

The Frank Lloyd Wright-designed Usonian homes in Pleasantville are:

Notable residents
 Aaron Resnick
 Mel Smilow
 Martin Scheiner
 Ann McGovern
 Roger Kahn

References

External links

 "Usonia Community Remembers Its Past", The New York Times
 "Wright Find Recalls His Influence On A Community". The New York Times
 "Updating Wright's Ideal", The New York Times
 "Green Before It Had a Name", The New York Times
 Pleasantville has the Wright Stuff, Retro Info!
 Photos on Flickr
 

Frank Lloyd Wright buildings
Houses in Westchester County, New York
Historic districts on the National Register of Historic Places in New York (state)
Modernist architecture in New York (state)
Historic districts in Westchester County, New York
National Register of Historic Places in Westchester County, New York
Mount Pleasant, New York